Hibiscus aculeatus is a species of plant in the family Malvaceae. Common names include comfortroot and pineland hibiscus.

Description 
Hibiscus aculeatus is a flowering plant.  Hibiscus aculeatus is described by Weakley as having harshly scabrous stems and leaves with three lobes. The flower can be identified by a dark red inner circle surrounded by a cream to white outer circle pattern on the petals. The perennial shrub is known to flower at any point from late spring to early fall. They are a member of the family Malvaceae, also known as the mallow family.

The species is pollinated by bees, especially bumblebees.

Habitat 

Hibiscus aculeatus is a wetland plant native to the southeastern United States from Texas to South Carolina, though, it has been introduced to Bangladesh.  A map of distribution is included beneath the species box. These plants like to grow in warm, tropical and subtropical climates. The types of habitats the Hibiscus aculeatus is found in include bogs, ditches, savannahs, and hydric to mesic pine flatwoods. Natural heritage record(s) exist for Hibiscus aculeatus in the 03 watershed region (depicted in image) in the following watersheds (with watershed codes): 

 Pamlico Sound (03020105) 
 White Oak River (03020301) 
 Lower Cape Fear (03030005) 
 Lumber (03040203)

Conservation status 
As of 1988, the species had a NatureServe status of G4G5 (secure to appearing to be secure).

References  

aculeatus